Live Santa Monica '72 is a live album by English singer-songwriter David Bowie. It is the official release of KMET FM's radio broadcast, then bootleg album and – later – semi-legal release Santa Monica '72, recorded at the Santa Monica Civic Auditorium during the Ziggy Stardust Tour.

By November 2008 the album had sold 10,000 copies in US.

Track listing
All songs written by David Bowie except where noted.

Personnel

Musicians
David Bowie – vocals, acoustic guitar
Mick Ronson – lead guitar, backing vocals
Trevor Bolder – bass guitar
Mick "Woody" Woodmansey – drums
Mike Garson – keyboards

Technical personnel
Mike Moran – recording engineer
Grover Hesley – mixing engineer
B. Mitchel Reed – KMET announcer
Bob Griffin – KMET engineer
Bill Fure – KMET engineer
Bill Calucci – KMET studio tape editor
Richard Kimball – KMET producer
Ted Jensen – mastering engineer

Chart performance

References

External links
 Live Santa Monica '72 (2008, UK, vinyl edition) on Discogs.

David Bowie live albums
2008 live albums
Albums recorded at the Santa Monica Civic Auditorium
EMI Records live albums